Pectinatella magnifica, the magnificent bryozoan, is a member of the Bryozoa phylum, in the order Plumatellida. It is a colony of organisms that bind together; these colonies can sometimes be 60 centimeters (2 feet) in diameter.
These organisms can be found mostly in North America with some in Europe. They are often found attached to objects, but can be found free floating as well. They form a translucent body with many star-like blooms along the outside. The density of the organism is similar to that of gelatin, and is easily breakable into smaller chunks.

Gallery

References

Phylactolaemata
Freshwater animals of Europe
Freshwater animals of North America
Animals described in 1851
Taxa named by Joseph Leidy